Jean-Loup Hubert (born 4 October 1949) is a French director and screenwriter.

Filmography

References

External links
 

1949 births
French film directors
French male screenwriters
French screenwriters
Living people